Forrest is a former small railway settlement and stopping place on the Nullarbor Plain,  west of the Western Australia / South Australia state border. It was established in 1916 during construction of the Trans-Australian Railway. The 2016 census recorded no residents.

Forrest is on the part of the Trans-Australian Railway that is the longest – at  – stretch of straight railway line in the world. 

The settlement was named after Sir John Forrest, the explorer who became the first Premier of Western Australia. He was much involved in the push for Australia's federation and was the pre-eminent advocate for building the Trans-Australian Railway.

Forrest Airport, on the east–west air route, is an important stopping place for refuelling aircraft with short-range flight capacity. It was established in 1929, when it was the overnight stop on the first scheduled passenger air service between Perth and Adelaide, operated by West Australian Airways from 1929 to 1934. It has been in continuous use since then. Today, the airfield consists of two sealed runways 1350 metres and 1520 metres long, an aircraft parking hangar, and Avgas and Jet A1 aviation fuel refuelling points. Nearby cottages can be booked for overnight accommodation. 

Although the Trans-Australian Railway runs past Forrest and there is a long crossing loop in the single-line track, Forrest no longer functions as a minor station as it did when it originated, in 1916, from the need to service steam locomotives and maintain track. Up to about a dozen railway families lived there for four decades. However, from 1951, when steam engines were replaced by diesel locomotives that did not have to stop regularly for water and were very reliable, fewer employees were needed. A change-over from timber to concrete sleepers, continuous welded rail and mechanised track maintenance equipment also reduced the need for labour, and eventually the employee housing and all other railway facilities were demolished. After 1997, when the assets of Australian National Railways were sold to private operators, all maintenance of track and facilities was undertaken by non-resident contractors.

The sole passenger train on the line, the Indian Pacific experiential tourism train, does not stop there.

Climate
Forrest has a typical arid climate; however it is cooler in summer than much of the Australian desert due to its proximity to the ocean. Despite this,  Forrest held the record for the equal 6th-hottest temperature in Australia,  being recorded on 13 January 1979.

See also
 List of extreme temperatures in Australia

Notes

References

Towns in Western Australia
Goldfields-Esperance
Nullarbor Plain
Trans-Australian Railway